KXCL (101.7 FM) is a radio station licensed to Rock Creek Park, Colorado, United States. The station is currently owned by Calvary Church with Ed Taylor. The station received approval from the Federal Communications Commission on November 1, 2013, to change its city of license from Westcliffe, Colorado to Rock Creek Park (southwest of Colorado Springs) and increase its power from 180 watts to 2,100 watts to serve the Colorado Springs area.

Calvary Chapel Aurora agreed to purchase KXCL from United States CP, LLC for $400,000. The purchase was consummated on October 31, 2013. Calvary plans to use KXCL to bring its "Grace FM" programming from KXGR into the Colorado Springs market.

References

External links
 

XCL